This is a round-up of the 1993 Sligo Senior Football Championship. Eastern Harps won their first Championship since 1975, after defeating Tubbercurry by a point in the final. This was the beginning of a new era of domination by two clubs, as Harps and Tourlestrane would claim the majority of honours for the rest of the decade, just as Tubbercurry and St. Mary's had done in the 1980s.

First round

Quarter finals

Semi-finals

Sligo Senior Football Championship Final

References

 Sligo Champion (July–September 1993)

Sligo Senior Football Championship
Sligo Senior Football Championship